The Occidente Heavyweight Championship (called the Campeonato de Peso Completo de Occidente in Spanish) is a Mexican Lucha Libre (professional wrestling) championship created by Consejo Mundial de Lucha Libre's (CMLL) Gudalajara branch. The term Occidente refers to the western part of Mexico, specifically the state of Jalisco. sanctioned by Comisión de Box y Lucha Libre Guadalajara ("the Guadalajara Boxing and Wrestling Commission" in Spanish). Although the Commission sanctions the title, it does not promote the events in which the title is defended. The current champion is Diamante Azul, who won the championship on February 2. 2014 when he defeated Olímpico. While Diamante Azul is the longest reigning champion, at  days, the title has been inactive for long periods of time when Diamante Azul lived in France.

The championship is designated as a heavyweight title, which means that the Championship can officially only be competed for by wrestlers weighing at least . In the 20th century Mexican wrestling enforced the weight divisions more strictly, but in the 21st century the rules were occasionally ignored for the various weight divisions. One example was Diamante holding the championship while officially being billed as weighing , well below the weight limit. While the Heavyweight title is traditionally considered the most prestigious weight division in professional wrestling, CMLL places more emphasis on the lower weight divisions. As such, the CMLL World Heavyweight Title is not considered the top CMLL Championship. As it is a professional wrestling championship, it is not won through legitimate competition; it is instead won via a scripted ending to a match.

Title history

Tournaments

2012
The Occidente Heavyweight Championship was officially declared vacant in June, 2008. The title had in effect been inactive since former champion Sheriff had begun working under the enmascarado (masked) character Cien Caras Jr. in 2005, with no reference being made to his former ring character. CMLL decided to hold a 10-man torneo cibernetico on July 13, 2012 to determine which two wrestlers would face off for the title the following week. Diamante and Misterioso Jr. outlasted the remaining field that included Brazo de Plata, Brazo de Oro, Rey Escorpión, Espectrum, El Hijo del Fantasma, Ráfaga, León Blanco and Gran Kenut. On July 20 Diamante defeated Misterioso Jr. becoming the first Occidente Heavyweight Champion in seven years.

Footnotes

References

Consejo Mundial de Lucha Libre championships
Regional professional wrestling championships